The 1959–60 Serie A season was the 26th season of the Serie A, the top level of ice hockey in Italy. Four teams participated in the league, and HC Diavoli Milano won the championship.

Regular season

External links
 Season on hockeytime.net

1959–60 in Italian ice hockey
Serie A (ice hockey) seasons
Italy